This list of Vogue Türkiye cover models is a catalog of cover models who have appeared on the cover of Vogue Türkiye, the Turkish edition of Vogue magazine, starting with the magazine's first issue in March 2010.

2010

2011

2012

2013

2014

2015

2016

2017

2018

2019

2020

2021

External links
Vogue Turkey cover archive

Turkey
Vogue
Turkish fashion